Boonea seminuda is a species of sea snail, a marine gastropod mollusk in the family Pyramidellidae, the pyrams and their allies. The species is one of eleven known species within the Boonea genus of gastropods.

The preferred host of this ectoparasite is the common slipper shell Crepidula fornicata or the Atlantic bay scallop Argopecten irradians.

Description
The glossy white, shell is translucent. Its length measures 3.75 mm. The teleoconch contains seven convex whorls. Those of the spire and upper half of the body are longitudinally plicate. They are crossed by three spiral lines, giving a granulated appearance. The folds terminate at the periphery. Below it on the body whorl are four spiral striae. The suture is distinct, but indistinctly margined. The columellar fold is inconspicuous.

Distribution
This marine species occurs in the following locations:
 North West Atlantic Ocean: Prince Edward Island, New England, Gulf of Maine
 Caribbean Sea: Colombia
 Gulf of Mexico: Mexico
 Puerto Rico

References

 Adams, C. B. (1839). Observations on some species of the marine shells of Massachusetts, with descriptions of five new species. Boston Journal of Natural History 2: 262–288, pl. 4
 Dall, W. H. (1884). On a collection of shells sent from Florida by Mr. Henry Hemphill. Proceedings of the United States National Museum 6(384) 318–342, pl. 10
 Bartsch, P. (1909). Pyramidellidae of New England and the adjacent region. Proceedings of the Boston Society of Natural History 34: 67-113, pls. 11-14
 Henderson, J. B. and P. Bartsch. (1914). Littoral marine mollusks of Chincoteague Island, Virginia. Proceedings of the United States National Museum 47(2055) 411–421, pls. 13-14

External links
 To Biodiversity Heritage Library (4 publications)
 To Encyclopedia of Life
 To USNM Invertebrate Zoology Mollusca Collection
 To ITIS
 To World Register of Marine Species

Pyramidellidae
Gastropods described in 1839